WURO-LD, virtual and UHF digital channel 18, is a low-powered Court TV-affiliated television station licensed to Roscommon, Michigan, United States. Owned by M33 Media, the station began broadcasting in August 2014.

Digital channels

The station's digital signal is multiplexed:

References

External links
 M33 Media
 
 RabbitEars: WURO
 Michiguide: WURO

Television channels and stations established in 2014
Television stations in Michigan
Movies! affiliates
Decades (TV network) affiliates
Low-power television stations in the United States
Heroes & Icons affiliates